Acatalasia  is an autosomal recessive peroxisomal disorder caused by absent or very low levels of the enzyme catalase. Catalase breaks down hydrogen peroxide in cells into water and oxygen. Low levels of catalase can cause hydrogen peroxide to build up, causing damage to cells.

Presentation
The disorder is relatively benign, although it causes an increased incidence of oral ulcers, and can under rare circumstances lead to gangrene. Symptoms primarily affect children.

Genetic 
Acatalasia is often the result of mutations in both copies of the CAT gene which codes for the enzyme catalase. There are multiple types of mutation that can cause this condition. Inheriting a single CAT mutation results in hypocatalasia, in which catalase levels are reduced, but still at functional levels.

Diagnosis
This disorder is commonly diagnosed pouring hydrogen peroxide on the patient's blood sample. Instead of a very bubbling reaction, blood turns brown-colored, which means the patient suffers from acatalasia.

Management

Epidemiology 
In parts of Japan, this condition has been found in approximately 1.4% of people. Researchers estimate that the condition occurs in 1 in 20,000 people in Hungary and Switzerland.

History
In 1948, Dr. Shigeo Takahara (1908–1994), a Japanese otolaryngologist first reported this new disease. He had examined a patient with an oral ulcer. He had spread hydrogen peroxide on the diseased part, but oxygen was not generated due to the lack of catalase.

See also
 List of cutaneous conditions

References

External links 

Peroxisomal disorders
Autosomal recessive disorders
Conditions of the mucous membranes